Igor Vasilyevich Cherniy (born 9 February 1968) is a Russian professional football coach and a former player.

External links
  Career profile at KLISF

1968 births
Living people
Soviet footballers
SKA Odesa players
Russian football managers
FC Chernomorets Novorossiysk managers
Association football goalkeepers